Paul Parker (born in San Francisco, California) is an American Hi-NRG and dance singer.

Career
Parker's biggest success came in the 1980s, when he reached No. 1 on the Hot Dance Music/Club Play chart twice. First was "Right on Target" in 1982, written and produced by Patrick Cowley who also produced Parker's 1983 debut album Too Much To Dream. "Shot In the Night" was the second single to be released from the album. Parker also did a cover of Cyndi Lauper's "Time After Time" (1985), and released another single entitled "One Look (One Look Was Enough)" in 1987. He continued in the 1990s with a string of additional dance covers.

In 2007, Parker began a collaboration with UTMOSIS, a San Francisco-based label, producing the worldwide digital single releases "Just Hold On To Love" (2007), "Don't Stop (What You're Doin' To Me)" (2008) and "Chargin' Me Up" (2009).

In 2008, he recorded a duet with the synthpop band Ganymede, "Perfect Target", which appears on the band's LP Operation Ganymede.

Parker's first full-length album of original material in over a decade, Take It From Me, was released January 26, 2010 on the UTMOSIS label.

In 2013, he released an EP titled Superman with Harlem Nights, in classic Patrick Cowley style.

Discography

Albums 
Too Much To Dream (April, 1983)
Artwork By [Label] – Jim Saunders
Artwork By [Lithography], Design [Graphic Design] – David Willers, Scott Gibb
Artwork By [Set Design] – Eugene Nevins, Tony La Rosa
Backing Vocals – Jo Carol Block*, Lauren Carter
Bass [Bass Guitar] – Maurice Tani
Co-producer [Associate Producer] – Marty Blecman
Engineer [Mixing Engineer] – Ken Kessie
Engineer [Recording Engineer] – Maureen Droney
Guitar – James Wirrick
Lead Vocals, Backing Vocals – Paul Parker
Management – Ken Crivello
Mastered By – José Rodriguez
Percussion [Additional] – David Frazier
Photography [Cover] – Gary Gay
Producer, Synthesizer, Keyboards – Patrick Cowley
Soloist, Saxophone [Sax Solos] – Mark Baum
 Destiny (1995)
 The Collection (1992)
 Take it From Me (2010)
 The Definitive Collection (2013)
 The Man That Fell To Earth (2017)

See also
List of number-one dance hits (United States)
List of artists who reached number one on the US Dance chart

References

External links
Paul Parker's Official Website
UTMOSIS, Paul Parker's most recent label

Year of birth missing (living people)
Living people
American male singers
American dance musicians
American hi-NRG musicians
Singers from San Francisco